Gemma Bridge (born 17 May 1993) is an English athlete specialising in the racewalking events.

Biography
Born in Oxford, she studied biology at the University of Birmingham and ran cross country for the varsity team. Gemma completed her Masters in the United States at McNeese State University where she also ran for the university. Gemma was recently awarded her doctorate from Leeds Beckett University. Gemma now works as a Research Evidence Impact Officer at Leeds Beckett University. Alongside this role, Gemma works as a marketing associate for HIIT Science, is the Leeds Area Activator for Good Gym and is a volunteer writer for Leeds Living, Leeds College of Technology and Yorkshire Art.
 
She became British champion for the second time when winning the 5000 metres race walk event at the 2020 British Athletics Championships with a time of 22 min 51.15 sec. She also won the 20 km Race Walking Association Championships in Leeds, which doubled as the British Championships, with a time of 1 hour 32 mins. She finished fifth in the women's 20 kilometres walk at the 2018 Commonwealth Games and has represented her country at the World Championships in Athletics and IAAF World Race Walking Team Championships. Gemma currently trains in Leeds at Leeds Beckett University.

References

Living people
1993 births
British female racewalkers
English female racewalkers
Commonwealth Games competitors for England
Athletes (track and field) at the 2018 Commonwealth Games
World Athletics Championships athletes for Great Britain
British Athletics Championships winners